The Men's 400 Freestyle at the 10th FINA World Swimming Championships (25m) was swum 17 December 2010 in Dubai, United Arab Emirates. 51 individuals swam in the preliminary heats in the morning, with the top-8 finishers advancing to the final that evening to swim again.

At the start of the event, the existing World (WR) and Championship records (CR) were:

Results

Heats

Final

References

Freestyle 0400 metre, Men's
World Short Course Swimming Championships